Leon Karp (1903-1951) was an American artist.

Biography
Karp was born in Brooklyn, New York in 1903. He attended the Pennsylvania Museum School of Industrial Art and the Pennsylvania Academy of the Fine Arts. He was also associated with the Atelier 17 printmaking studio. Karp died on August 3, 1951 in New York at the age of 47. 

Karp's work is included in the collections of the Metropolitan Museum of Art, the Museum of Modern Art, the National Gallery of Art, and the Smithsonian American Art Museum.

References

External links
images of Karp's work on Invaluable
images of Karp's work on MutualArt

1903 births
1951 deaths 
20th-century American artists
Atelier 17 alumni